Andrea Lowe (born 1 May 1975 in Arnold, Nottinghamshire) is an English actress.

Career
She started her theatre career at Sheffield's Crucible Theatre in the play The Birthday Party by Harold Pinter.

In 1993 she had her first film role, alongside Samantha Morton, in the musical comedy drama called The Token King, set in a high school in Nottingham. Among her extensive work since then, Lowe guest starred in two episodes of the second season of The Tudors in which she played Lady Eleanor Luke, a fictional noblewoman who was briefly the mistress of Henry VIII, played Vicky in the 2009 TV film, The Unloved, and she played the role of Annie Cabbot in the British television network ITV series DCI Banks (2011–2016), having also played in its pilot, DCI Banks: Aftermath (2010).

She starred in Alan Ayckbourn's play How the Other Half Loves alongside Jenny Seagrove and Jason Merrells at the Duke of York's Theatre, the West End theatre, on St Martin's Lane, London in 2016.

Film work
 2013 The Arbiter as Kate
 2010 Route Irish (Sixteen Films)
 2002 Club Le Monde as Sarah (Screen Production Associates)
 2000 Pandaemonium as Edith Southey (Mariner Films)
 2000 Threesome as Melanie (Sugar & Water Films)
 1985 Missing in Action 2: The Beginning as Hooker #3 (Metro-Goldwyn-Mayer)
 Repeat After Me (Channel 4 Dogma Series; Ideal World)
 The Rover’s Return (Short End Films)
 The Perfect G (London Guildhall)
 The Token King (Channel 4)
 Snorted (Goldsmiths College)

TV work
Endeavour, Series 8, Episode 2, Pauline Lund, 2022
Agatha Raisin - “The Wizard of Evesham” (Eve Pemberton) 2018
Trust Me - TV Series, 2 episodes (Ally Sutton) 2017
Midsomer Murders Series 16, Episode 2 "Let Us Prey" (Ava Gould) 2014
Lewis Series 8, "The Lions of Nemea" (Philippa Garwood) 2014
Inspector George Gently Series 6, "Blue For Bluebird" (Cherry Stretch) 2014
Love Life (mini series, 3 episodes) (Lucy) 2012
DCI Banks (series) (DS Annie Cabbot) 2011–2016
DCI Banks: Aftermath  (DS Annie Cabbot) 2010
Accused Series One, Episode 4, "Kenny's Story" (Donna Armstrong) 2010
The Unloved (movie) (Vicki) 2009
Coronation Street three episodes (Naomi) 2009
The Tudors Series Two, episodes 3 & 4 (Lady Eleonor Luke) 2008
No Heroics Series One, episode 1 "Supergroupie" (Vicci) 2008
Silent Witness Episode "Terror" Parts 1&2 (Emily Wright) 2008
Torchwood Series Two, episode "Fragments" (Katie) 2008
Agatha Christie's Marple "Ordeal By Innocence" (Maureen) 2007
Murphy's Law (Series 5) (Kim Goodall) 2007Where the Heart Is – TV Series, 9 episodes, (Zoë Phelps) 2006Cracker (Elaine) 2006Murder City – "Death of a Ladies' Man" (Helen Osborn) 2006The Bill – Episodes 400 and 401 (Leigh Bevan) 2006Love Soup – "The Reflecting Pool" (Tina) 2005A Thing Called Love (Liz Leech) 2004No Angels – Episode No. 1.9 (Julia) 2004Fields of Gold (W.P.C.) 2002Rescue Me (Melanie Woods)Peak Practice – Suffer the Little Children (Zoë Thomson) 2001The Sleeper (Donna) 2000Nature Boy (Claire Whitaker) 2000Night and Day (BBC)Doctors – Episode "Second Chance" (Jackie Dean)

Selected theatre workHow The Other Half Loves (Duke of York's Theatre, West End, London)Bash (Citizens Theatre Glasgow)A Day in Dull Armour (Royal Court Theatre Upstairs)The Birthday Party (Crucible Theatre Sheffield)Lost and Found (River House Barn)Gong Donkeys'' (The Bush Theatre)

References

External links

BBC's New Faces page

1975 births
Living people
English television actresses
English film actresses
English stage actresses
People from Arnold, Nottinghamshire
Actresses from Nottinghamshire
20th-century English actresses
21st-century English actresses